CLEP may refer to:
 Chinese Lunar Exploration Program, a moon exploration project by the People's Republic of China
 College Level Examination Program offered by the College Board in the United States
 Challenger II Life Extension Programme, a UK main battle tank improvement programme
 Chinese Language Elective Programme, an educational programme in Singapore, see Secondary education in Singapore